is a Japanese professional footballer who plays as a midfielder for Polish club Stal Mielec.

Career statistics

Club

Notes

References

2001 births
Living people
Association football people from Osaka Prefecture
Japanese footballers
Association football midfielders
Ekstraklasa players
I liga players
II liga players
III liga players
OKS Stomil Olsztyn players
Zagłębie Lubin players
Stal Mielec players
Japanese expatriate footballers
Expatriate footballers in Poland
Japanese expatriate sportspeople in Poland